Shadows Are Security is the third album by American metalcore band As I Lay Dying. The album was released on June 14, 2005 through Metal Blade Records, and was produced by Tim Lambesis, the band's vocalist, and Phil Sgrosso, one of the band's guitarists, along with Steve Russell. A Limited Edition was released on June 23, 2005 with a bonus DVD of a show filmed at the Substage Club in Karlsruhe, Germany on November 28, 2004. The CD was released again as a Special Edition on October 17, 2006 with a DVD on the making of the album and included videos of "Confined", "Through Struggle", and "The Darkest Nights". It also featured additional liner notes from vocalist Tim Lambesis on the concept of the record and little known facts on the making of the album.

The album peaked at #35 on the US Billboard 200 and sold as of 2007, about 275,000 copies. It has also produced three singles in "Confined", "Through Struggle" and "The Darkest Nights". Music videos were shot for all three of them.

Although the album doesn't feature a title track, the album gets its name from a lyric of their song, "Control Is Dead".

Track listing 

Notes
 "Illusions" is a re-recording of a song from the As I Lay Dying/American Tragedy split album.

Personnel 
Production and performance credits are adapted from the album liner notes.

As I Lay Dying

 Tim Lambesis – lead vocals
 Nick Hipa – lead guitar
 Phil Sgrosso – rhythm guitar, bass
 Clint Norris – bass, clean vocals
 Jordan Mancino – drums

Additional musicians

 Dave Arthur – backing clean vocals
 Daniel Weyandt – guest vocals on "Control is Dead".

Production

 Tim Lambesis – production
 Phil Sgrosso – production
 Steve Russell – co-producer, engineer
 Andy Sneap – mixing, mastering
 Danny de la Isla – editing
 Kevin Puig – pre-production
 Jacob Bannon – artwork, design
 Kevin Estrada – photography

Charts

References

2005 albums
Albums with cover art by Jacob Bannon
As I Lay Dying (band) albums
Metal Blade Records albums